Raymond Morris may refer to:
 Raymond Leslie Morris, convicted child murderer and rapist
 Raymond Morris (cricketer)
 Raymond Vincent Morris (1889–1943), member of the Early Birds of Aviation